Prohner Stausee is a lake in the Vorpommern-Rügen district in Mecklenburg-Vorpommern, Germany. At an elevation of 2.6 m, its surface area is 0.55 km².

Lakes of Mecklenburg-Western Pomerania